Ernest George Daunt (10 January 1909 – 1 December 1966) was Archdeacon of Cork from 1962 until 1966.

Daunt was educated at Bandon Grammar School and Trinity College, Dublin; and ordained in 1933.
  After  curacies in Dublin he held incumbencies at Balbriggan (1937–1946); Killiney, (1946–1950); Rathgar, (1950–1953); and St. Ann's Church, Dawson Street (1953-1962).

References

1909 births
People educated at Bandon Grammar School
Alumni of Trinity College Dublin
1966 deaths
Deans of Cork
Ernest
Place of birth missing
Place of death missing
20th-century Irish Anglican priests